was a village located  in Aida District, Okayama Prefecture, Japan.

As of 2003, the village had an estimated population of 1,399 and a density of 49.95 persons per km2. The total area was 28.01 km2.

On March 31, 2005, Higashiawakura, along with the towns of Mimasaka (former), Aida, Ōhara and Sakutō (all from Aida District), and the town of Katsuta (from Katsuta District), was merged to create the city of Mimasaka.

Geography
Mountains: Mount Ushiro (The highest mountain in Okayama Prefecture)

Adjoining municipalities
Okayama Prefecture
Ōhara
Nishiawakura
Hyōgo Prefecture
Sayō
Chikusa

Education
Higashiawakura Elementary School
Ōhara Junior High School (Ōhara)

Transportation

Road
National highways:
Route 429
Prefectural roads:
Okayama Prefectural Route 556 (Ushiroyama-Kamiishii)

External links
Official website of Mimasaka in Japanese

Dissolved municipalities of Okayama Prefecture
Mimasaka, Okayama